State Highway 114 (SH 114) is a state highway that runs from the Dallas-Fort Worth Metroplex westward across Texas to the state border with New Mexico, where it becomes New Mexico State Road 114, which eventually ends at Elida, New Mexico at US 70 / NM 330.

History

The route was originally designated on April 14, 1926 as connector between Dallas and Rhome. In June 1932, SH 114 was extended to Bridgeport. On February 12, 1935, an extension northward from Chico to Sunset was added. On July 15, 1935, the section from Chico to Sunset was cancelled. This section was restored on August 1, 1938. On October 6, 1943, the section of SH 114 from US 77 in Dallas to US 67 was cancelled. On October 1, 1968, the concurrency with SH 24 from Bridgeport to Chico was removed because SH 24 (now US 380) was rerouted. On January 7, 1971, SH 114 was relocated in Bridgeport. This route remained little changed until November 3, 1972, when it was extended northward from Sunset to Bowie.  Major rerouting was made on November 24, 1975, when the route was redirected west over U.S. Highway 380, U.S. Highway 281, former SH 199, and U.S. Highway 82 from Bridgeport to Lubbock, with the stretch from Bridgeport to Bowie renumbered as SH 101. On December 14, 1977, the route was extended to the New Mexico border, replacing SH 116. The connecting NM 116 was renumbered to NM 114.

On August 2, 1985, Delta Air Lines Flight 191 crossed this route shortly before crashing on approach to Dallas/Fort Worth Airport. One of the aircraft's engines struck a car on the roadway, instantly killing its occupant; 136 people on the flight also died in the accident.

In 2010, work began on a  stretch, dubbed the DFW Connector, between SH 121 and International Parkway. A quarter of the $1 billion project was funded by federal stimulus funds enacted under the American Recovery and Reinvestment Act of 2009. The project's aim was ease congestion at North Texas' worst traffic problem. The project called for as many as 24 lanes and 2 TEXpress lanes along a  mile stretch between SH 26 and International Parkway. The Texas Department of Transportation (TxDOT) awarded the project in a joint venture led by Kiewit. The SH 114 section of the DFW Connector was completed in 2014.

Route description 
Highway 114 starts at the New Mexico border about 17 miles west of Morton, Texas. The route passes through Whiteface, Levelland, and Smyer as Levelland Highway before joining 19th Street in Lubbock. SH 114 crosses over Loop 289 and while crossing over US 82 joins with US 62, forming the southern edge of the Texas Tech University campus. After crossing US 84, the highway veers northeast, joining US 82 before crossing over Loop 289 and leaving Lubbock as Idalou Road.

Past Lubbock, SH 114 passes through the rural towns of Idalou, Lorenzo, Ralls (where US 62 turns north), Crosbyton, Dickens, Guthrie, Benjamin, Vera, Red Springs, and Seymour, where US 82 splits north off of SH 114. From there, the highway passes through Megargal, Olney, Loving, and Jermyn before entering Jacksboro with US 281. In Jacksboro, SH 114 joins US 380 and US 281 splits off to the south as SH 114 continues east.

Past Jacksboro, SH 114 passes through Runaway Bay, Bridgeport, where SH 114 splits off of US 380, Paradise, Boyd, Aurora, Rhome, briefly running concurrent with US 81 and US 287 before entering Fort Worth and passing the Texas Motor Speedway and crossing I-35W.

In the DFW Metroplex, SH 114 goes through Roanoke, crossing US 377 and becoming a freeway, the Northwest Parkway. The highway passes through Westlake, Southlake, and Grapevine. There, SH 114 forms the northern edge of the Dallas/Fort Worth International Airport with SH 121. The highway becomes the John W. Carpenter Highway as it travels southeast to its eastern terminus at SH 183. A road was designated on February 21, 1938, from SH 114 to SH 121; either SH 114 Loop or SH 121 Loop. This was renumbered as Loop 10 on September 26, 1939.

Business routes

SH 114 has four current business routes.

Levelland business loop

Business State Highway 114-B (formerly Loop 44) is a Business Loop that runs from SH 114 on the west side of Levelland (in west Texas) south along West Street, then east through the downtown area on Houston Street to an intersection with US 385 (College Street). The road turns left (north), concurrent with US 385, until intersecting once again at SH 114.

Rhome business spur

Business State Highway 114-J is a Business Spur that goes east into Rhome from the intersection of US 81/US 287 and SH 114 west. The route runs along Rhome Avenue to an intersection with Business US 81-E.  It is part of a previous route of SH 114. Note that an earlier Spur 440 was designated on October 3, 1966 as a spur of SH 34 in Ennis. This was cancelled on or before the day the later Spur 440 was designated.

Roanoke business loop
Business State Highway 114-K is a business loop that runs through Roanoke. This route runs on Byron Nelson Boulevard, along a previous route of SH 114. The business route was created in 2001 when SH 114 was rerouted further north and east around town.

Former business routes

Former Bridgeport business loop

The route went east along Halsell Avenue from an intersection with SH 114, to an intersection with 13th Street, then turned right (south) until another intersection with SH 114. This route had been previously designated Loop 373 on November 1, 1962; since 2007, though, the portion along 13th was changed back to Loop 373.

Former Grapevine business loop

Business State Highway 114-L (formerly Loop 382 as well as a previous routing of SH 114) is a business loop that runs through Grapevine. This route runs east on Northwest Highway to an intersection with Texan Trail, then turns right to go southbound there. The road continues until it reaches SH 114/SH 121. The portion of the business route along Texan Trail is concurrent with SH 26. The route was designated on April 18, 1963, as Texas State Highway Loop 382 (but signed as Business SH 114), until June 21, 1990, when the road's designation as Loop 382 was discontinued. On November 21, 2013 the entire route was removed and returned to the city of Grapevine.

Major intersections

Notes

References

114
Transportation in Cochran County, Texas
Transportation in Lubbock, Texas
Transportation in Hockley County, Texas
Transportation in Lubbock County, Texas
Transportation in Crosby County, Texas
Transportation in Dickens County, Texas
Transportation in King County, Texas
Transportation in Knox County, Texas
Transportation in Baylor County, Texas
Transportation in Archer County, Texas
Transportation in Young County, Texas
Transportation in Jack County, Texas
Transportation in Wise County, Texas
Transportation in Denton County, Texas
Transportation in Tarrant County, Texas
Transportation in Dallas County, Texas